Howard Elbert Smither (November 15, 1925, Pittsburg, Kansas – February 1, 2020, Chapel Hill, North Carolina) was an American author, musicologist and historian of music. He is the uncle of musician Chris Smither and younger brother of the late Romance Language professor William J. Smither (1916-2007).

Education 

He completed his BA at Hamline University in 1950. He completed his MA at Cornell University in 1952.

Career 
He began teaching music at Oberlin College from 1955 to 1960, and subsequently taught at the University of Kansas (1960–1963), Tulane University (1963–1968), University of North Carolina (1968–1990) and University of Cardiff (1993–1995).

He received the 1978 ASCAP-Deems Taylor Award.

He received the Guggenheim Fellowship in 1984.

Bibliography 

His notable books include:

 A History of the Oratorio: The Oratorio in the Classical Era 
 Antecedents of the Oratorio: Sacred Dramatic Dialogues, 1600-1630 
 Oratorios of the Italian Baroque
 A History of the Oratorio

References 

1925 births
2020 deaths
American musicologists
People from Pittsburg, Kansas
Cornell University alumni
Hamline University alumni
Oberlin College faculty
University of Kansas faculty
American expatriates in the United Kingdom
Tulane University faculty